Impact was the official media outlet of the Young Conservatives in the United Kingdom. The magazine existed between 1964 and 1969 and was headquartered in London.

History and profile
Impact was launched in 1964, and its first issue dated Winter 1964. In the first issue the magazine declared itself as the official publication of the Young Conservatives, and its subtitle was the Young Conservative news magazine. The publisher of Impact was Conservative and Unionist Central Office, and it was based in London. As of 1967 one of the contributors was Robert Worley. Its circulation was about 10,000 copies. Impact folded following the publication of the issue dated Spring 1969.

References

1964 establishments in the United Kingdom
1969 disestablishments in the United Kingdom
Conservatism in the United Kingdom
Conservative magazines
Defunct political magazines published in the United Kingdom
Magazines established in 1964
Magazines disestablished in 1969
Magazines published in London